Andrew John Churchill (born 27 November 1970) is an English cricketer.  Churchill is a right-handed batsman who bowls left-arm medium pace.  He was born in Hornchurch in Greater London

Churchill represented the Essex Cricket Board in List A cricket.  His debut List A match came against Ireland in the 1999 NatWest Trophy.  From 1999 to 2001, he represented the Board in 4 List A matches, the last of which came against Suffolk in the 2001 Cheltenham & Gloucester Trophy.  In his 4 List A matches, he scored 19 runs at a batting average of 4.75, with a high score of 10.  In the field he took a single catch.  With the ball he took 5 wickets at a bowling average of 29.00, with best figures of 2/32.

He currently plays club cricket for Gidea Park and Romford Cricket Club in the Essex Premier League.

References

External links
Andrew Churchill at Cricinfo
Andrew Churchill at CricketArchive

1970 births
Living people
People from Hornchurch
English cricketers
Essex Cricket Board cricketers